The Waco Suspension Bridge crosses the Brazos River in Waco, Texas. It is a single-span suspension bridge, with a main span of 475 ft (145 m).  Opened on November 20, 1869, it contains nearly 3 million bricks.  It is located north of downtown Waco, connecting Indian Spring Park (on the southwest side of the river) with Doris D. Miller Park (on the northeast side of the river). Every year on Independence Day, the bridge serves as a place where thousands of locals gather to watch fireworks. Indian Spring Park marks the location of the origin of the town of Waco, where the Huaco Indians had settled on the bank of the river, at the location of a cold spring.

Before 1869, crossing the Brazos River was a time-consuming and sometimes dangerous ordeal. The only way to cross the river was by ferry, and due to the location of Waco on the growing Chisholm Trail, local businessmen knew that a bridge was needed to support commerce. For this reason, members of Waco Masonic Lodge #92 proposed the creation of such a bridge and they assigned a committee which would form the Waco Bridge Company, responsible for funding and building the project. A charter was received from the state in  1866.

Col. John T. Flint, an Austin lawyer and banker, who had moved to Waco after the war and established a firm named Flint & Chamberlain, went personally to New York to handle the contract for building a bridge.

In October 1868, the engineer he hired, Thomas M. Griffith, began to supervise the construction using cables from the Roebling company of Trenton, New Jersey. The logistical and engineering difficulties he encountered were abnormal because of the remote location.

Due to lack of machine shops in the Waco area, getting the materials to the building site was a journey in itself. Supplies were loaded onto a steamer in Galveston, and ferried to Bryan. From there, they were loaded onto wagons pulled by oxen. The pothole-filled dirt road from Bryan to Waco was bad, even by 19th-century Texas standards.

The twin double towers that anchored the span were considered to be a marvel of engineering at the time, containing nearly 3 million bricks, which were produced locally.

The bridge collected its first toll on January 1, 1870. Its  span made it the first major suspension bridge in Texas.

The bridge was wide enough for stagecoaches to pass each other, or for cattle to cross one side of the bridge, and humans to cross the other side. Being the only bridge to cross the Brazos at the time, and the primary river crossing for the north-south travel through Texas (including cattle drives on the Chisholm Trail), the cost of building the bridge, which was estimated to be $141,000, was quickly paid back. Tolls were 5 cents per head of cattle that crossed, along with a charge for pedestrian traffic.

In 1889, the bridge was sold to McLennan County for $75,000, which removed all tolls. In 1913-1914, major reconstruction occurred on the bridge, replacing the older steel with higher gauge, and trusses were added to accommodate the span to carry heavier weights. This doubled as a new pedestrian walkway.

By 1971, the bridge had seen over 100 years of traffic. What started out as a cattle bridge had become a vehicular bridge, and the state historical committee decided that it was time to be retired, with larger and arguably safer bridges being built since the inception of the Waco Suspension Bridge. The bridge, by all accounts, helped to transform Waco from a small frontier town to a major commercial center. Today, the bridge is open to foot traffic only.

Beginning in October 2020, the bridge was closed as part of a $12.4 million rehabilitation project that involved replacing the suspension cables that had been installed in 1914, reinforcing the anchors, and replacing the decking. Temporary piers were placed in the river to support the deck while the cables were removed.

The bridge was listed on the National Register of Historic Places in 1970, and was designated as a Texas Historic Civil Engineering Landmark by the American Society of Civil Engineers in 1971.

See also

List of bridges documented by the Historic American Engineering Record in Texas
List of bridges on the National Register of Historic Places in Texas
National Register of Historic Places listings in McLennan County, Texas

References

External links

Historic Bridge Foundation, featuring many photographs

Bridges completed in 1869
Road bridges on the National Register of Historic Places in Texas
Buildings and structures in Waco, Texas
Former road bridges in the United States
Historic American Engineering Record in Texas
Pedestrian bridges in Texas
Suspension bridges in Texas
Towers in Texas
Transportation in McLennan County, Texas
Tourist attractions in Waco, Texas
Former toll bridges in Texas
1869 establishments in Texas
National Register of Historic Places in McLennan County, Texas
Steel bridges in the United States
Brick bridges in the United States